

1950

1951

1953

1954

1955

1956

1957

1958

1959

References

LGBT
1950s in LGBT history
1950s
1950s
LGBT